Ramez Jamal Dayoub (born 9 August 1984) is a Lebanese former professional footballer who played as a defender. A former Lebanon national team player, Dayoub played in Lebanon, Myanmar, Bahrain, and Malaysia, before being banned from practicing football in 2013 due to his involvement in the Lebanese match-fixing scandal.

Club career 
Starting his career at Safa, it was reported that Dayoub had moved to I-League side East Bengal in summer 2009. However, the transfer eventually fell through, as Safa didn't issue his International Transfer Certificate (ITC), and the player returned back to Lebanon.

He subsequently moved to Myanmar at Yangon United a few months later, playing in an official game, but it was revealed in November that the transfer was carried out using forged documents. Dayoub was suspended indefinitely by the Lebanese Football Association (LFA).

On 11 November 2010, Dayoub moved to Al-Shabab in the Bahraini Premier League after FIFA approved of the transfer. Dayoub played in the 2011 Myanmar National League for Magway. In December 2011, he joined Selangor FA ahead of the 2012 Malaysia Super League.

On 26 February 2013, Dayoub was found to be involved in the 2013 Lebanese match-fixing scandal: he was accused of illegal betting on several national and continental games involving Lebanese teams and the national team. Dayoub was banned from football for life and fined $15,000. In view of the decision, Selangor FA had the player's registration with the Football Association of Malaysia annulled.

International career 
Dayoub debuted for the Lebanon national team on 3 October 2004, in a 3–1 defeat to Kuwait in a friendly. Dayoub participated in the 2010 and 2014 FIFA World Cup qualifiers, and the 2011 AFC Asian Cup qualifiers, as well as the 2007 WAFF Championship and 2009 King's Cup.

In the final round of the 2014 World Cup qualifiers, Dayoub was involved in throwing the game against Qatar. He was accused of match fixing and was suspended for life from football. Dayoub ended his international career with 34 caps.

Honours
Individual
 Lebanese Premier League Team of the Season: 2007–08

References

External links

 
 
 Ramez Dayoub at Selangor FA
 Ramez Dayoub at SportsTG

1984 births
Living people
Sportspeople from Tripoli, Lebanon
Lebanese footballers
Association football defenders 
Safa SC players
Yangon United F.C. players
Magway FC players
Selangor FA players
Lebanese Premier League players
Myanmar National League players
Bahraini Premier League players
Malaysia Super League players
Lebanon youth international footballers
Lebanon international footballers
Lebanese expatriate footballers
Lebanese expatriate sportspeople in Myanmar
Lebanese expatriate sportspeople in Bahrain
Lebanese expatriate sportspeople in Malaysia
Lebanese expatriate sportspeople in Australia
Expatriate footballers in Myanmar
Expatriate footballers in Bahrain
Expatriate footballers in Malaysia
Expatriate soccer players in Australia
Match fixers
Sportspeople banned for life